600 Seconds (1987 to 1993) was an immensely popular TV news program that aired in the Soviet Union and briefly in post-Soviet Russia. It was a nightly broadcast from Leningrad TV with anchor Alexander Nevzorov.

The program of the glasnost period was distinguished by its fast tempo and the display of the countdown from 600 to zero. The anchor Nevzorov used the broadcast in order to criticize corrupt Soviet officials and promote preserving the Soviet Union (in the Baltic States, he is known as a fierce opponent of the national independence movements). Later – during the early Yeltsin years – the broadcast became a mouthpiece of Russian Nationalist opposition to Yeltsin's policies and was banned twice – definitively after Yeltsin's victory in his conflict with the rebel parliament.  The Letter of Forty-Two called for it to be cancelled.

References

1980s Soviet television series
1990s Russian television series
Russian television news shows